10476 Los Molinos, provisional designation , is a stony background asteroid and slow rotator from the inner regions of the asteroid belt, approximately  in diameter. It was discovered on 2 March 1981, by American astronomer Schelte Bus at the Siding Spring Observatory in Australia. The asteroid was named for the Los Molinos Observatory in Uruguay.

Orbit and classification 

Los Molinos is a non-family asteroid from the main belt's background population. It orbits the Sun in the inner asteroid belt at a distance of 1.7–2.9 AU once every 3 years and 6 months (1,289 days; semi-major axis of 2.32 AU). Its orbit has an eccentricity of 0.26 and an inclination of 9° with respect to the ecliptic.

Physical characteristics 

Based on its high albedo and its location within the asteroid belt, Los Molinos is an assumed S-type asteroid.

Rotation period 

In August 2010, a rotational lightcurve of Los Molinos was obtained from photometric observations in the R-band by astronomers at the Palomar Transient Factory in California. Lightcurve analysis gave a rotation period of  hours with a brightness amplitude of 0.33 magnitude. This makes Los Molinos one of the top 200 slow rotators known to exist.

Diameter and albedo 

According to the survey carried out by the NEOWISE mission of NASA's Wide-field Infrared Survey Explorer, Los Molinos measures 2.853 kilometers in diameter and its surface has a high albedo of 0.34.

The Collaborative Asteroid Lightcurve Link assumes a standard albedo for stony asteroids of 0.20 and calculates a diameter of 2.96 kilometers based on an absolute magnitude of 15.01.

Naming 

This minor planet was named after the Los Molinos Observatory located near Montevideo in Uruguay. The observatory is known for its astrometric follow-up observations of asteroids and comets. The official naming citation was published by the Minor Planet Center on 13 April 2017.

References

External links 
 Asteroid Lightcurve Database (LCDB), query form (info )
 Dictionary of Minor Planet Names, Google books
 Asteroids and comets rotation curves, CdR – Observatoire de Genève, Raoul Behrend
 Discovery Circumstances: Numbered Minor Planets (10001)-(15000) – Minor Planet Center
 

010476
Discoveries by Schelte J. Bus
Named minor planets
010476
19810302